Mohini (Sanskrit: मोहिनी) is the Hindu goddess of enchantment. She is the only female avatar of the Hindu god Vishnu. She is portrayed as a femme fatale, an enchantress, who maddens lovers and demons, sometimes leading them to their doom. Mohini is introduced into Hinduism in the narrative epic of the Mahabharata. Here, she appears as a form of Vishnu following the Churning of the Ocean, a mesmerising beauty who distributes the amrita (the elixir of immortality) to the weakened devas (gods) and depriving it to the dominant asuras (demons), allowing the former to defeat the latter with their newfound immortality.

Many different legends tell of her various exploits and marriages, including her union with the god Shiva. These tales relate, among other things, the birth of the god Shasta and the destruction of Bhasmasura, the ash-demon. Mohini's main modus operandi is to trick or beguile those she encounters. She is worshipped throughout Indian culture, but mainly in Western India, where temples are devoted to her depicted as Mahalasa, the consort of Khandoba, a regional avatar of Shiva.

Etymology
The name Mohini comes from the verb root moha, meaning "to delude, enchant, perplex, or illusion," and literally means "delusion personified." In the Baiga culture of Central India, the word mohini means "erotic magic or spell." The name also has an implied connotation of "the essence of female beauty and allurement."

Legends and history

The Amrita
The earliest reference to a Mohini-type goddess appears in the Samudra Manthana episode of the Hindu epic Mahabharata. The Amrita, or nectar of immortality, is produced by the churning of the Ocean of Milk. The Devas and the Asuras fight over its possession. The Asuras contrive to keep the Amrita for themselves, angering the Devas. Vishnu, wise to their plan, assumes the form of an "enchanting damsel". She uses her allure to trick the Asuras into giving her the Amrita, and then distributes it amongst the Devas. Rahu, an Asura, disguises himself as a god and tries to drink some Amrita himself. Surya (the sun-god) and Chandra (the moon-god) quickly inform Vishnu, and he uses the Sudarshana Chakra (the divine discus) to decapitate Rahu, leaving the head immortal. The other major Hindu epic, Ramayana (4th century BCE), narrates the Mohini story briefly in the Bala Kanda chapter. This same tale is also recounted in the Vishnu Purana four centuries later.
In the original text, Mohini is referred to as simply an enchanting, female form of Vishnu. In later versions, Mohini is described as the maya (illusion) of Vishnu. Later still, the name of the avatar becomes Mohini from the original phrase describing his deliberate false appearance (mayam ashito mohinim). Once the Mohini legend became popular, it was retold, revised, and expanded in several texts. The tales of Mohini-Vishnu also increased among devotional circles in various regions. The same expanded Mahabharata version of the story is also recounted in the Bhagavata Purana in the 10th century CE. Here, Mohini becomes a formal avatar of Vishnu.

This legend is also retold in the Padma Purana.

Slayer of demons

Mohini also has an active history in the destruction of demons throughout Hindu texts. In the Vishnu Purana, Mohini defeats Bhasmasura, the "ash-demon". Bhasmasura invokes the god Shiva by performing severe penances. Shiva, pleased with Bhasmasura, grants him the power to turn anyone into ashes by touching their head. The demon decides to try the power on Shiva himself. Shiva prays to Vishnu for help and Vishnu transforms into Mohini and charms Bhasmasura. Bhasmasura is so taken by Mohini that he asks her to marry him. Mohini agrees, but only on the condition that Bhasmasura follows her move for move in a dance. In the course of the dance, she places her hand on her head. Bhasmasura mimics the action, and in turn, reduces himself to ashes. The legend of Bhasmasura is retold in the Buddhist text Satara Dewala Devi Puvata, with a slight variation. In this tale, Vishnu assumes his female form (the name "Mohini" is not used) and charms Bhasmasura. The female Vishnu asks Bhasmasura to promise never to leave her by placing his hand on his head as per the usual practice to swear on one's head. On doing so, Bhasmasura is reduced to ashes.

In a similar legend related to the birth of Ayyappa, the demon Surpanaka earns the power to turn anyone into ashes by his austerities. The tale mirrors all other aspects of the Buddhist version of the Bhasmasura tale, where he is forced by Mohini to severe fidelity by keeping his hand on his head and is burnt.

The prelude of the Ramakien, the Thai version of the Ramayana, the demon Nontok is charmed and killed by Mohini-Vishnu. Nontok misuses a divine weapon given to him by Shiva. The four-armed Mohini-Vishnu enchants Nontok and then attacks him. In his last moments, the demon accuses Vishnu of foul play saying that Vishnu first seduced him and then attacked him. Vishnu decrees that in his next birth, Nontok will be born as the ten-headed demon Ravana and Vishnu will be a mortal man called Rama. He will then fight him and defeat him.

In a lesser-known tale in the Ganesha Purana (900–1400 CE) the wise asura king Virochana is rewarded a magical crown by the sun-god Surya. The crown shields him against all harm. Vishnu as Mohini then enchants Virochana and steals his crown. The demon, thus unprotected, is killed by Vishnu.

Another South Indian legend about the demon Araka associates Mohini with Krishna (an avatar of Vishnu) rather than the god himself. The demon Araka had become virtually invincible because he had never laid eyes on a woman (extreme chastity). Krishna takes the form of the beautiful Mohini and marries him. After three days of marriage, Araka's bonds of chastity are broken, and Krishna kills him in battle. Transgender Hijras consider Krishna-Mohini to be a transsexual deity.

Relationship with Shiva

Stories about Mohini and Shiva have been popular in South Indian texts. In the southern version of the Bhagavata Purana, after Vishnu deceives the demons by his maya female form, Shiva sees Mohini. He becomes "bereft of shame and robbed by her of good sense," runs crazily behind the enchanting form, while his wife Parvati (Uma) looks on. Shiva is overcome by Kāma (love and desire) in this version of mythology. Shiva's seed falls on the ground creating ores of silver and gold. Vishnu then states that emotions are difficult to overcome, and states that Maya will become a half of Shiva's Ardhanarisvara aspect. Shiva then extols Vishnu's power.

In the Brahmanda Purana when the wandering sage Narada tells Shiva about Vishnu's Mohini form that deluded the demons, Shiva dismisses him. Shiva and his wife Parvati go to Vishnu's home. Shiva asks him to take on the Mohini form again so he can see the actual transformation for himself. Vishnu smiles, and transforms himself into Mohini. Overcome by desire, Shiva chases Mohini. Shiva grabs Mohini's hand and embraces her, but Mohini frees herself and runs further. Finally, Shiva grabs her and their "violent coupling" leads to the discharge of Shiva's seed which falls on the ground and the god Maha-Shasta ("The Great Chastiser") is born. Mohini disappears, while Shiva returns home with Parvati.

Shasta is identified primarily with two regional deities: Ayyappa from Kerala and the Tamil Aiyanar. He is also identified with the classical Hindu gods Skanda and Hanuman. In the later story of the origin of Ayyappa, Shiva impregnates Mohini, who gives birth to Ayyappa. They abandon Ayyappa, who is born to kill Mahishi, and the child was found by a king who raised him. The legend highlights Vishnu's protests to be Mohini again and also notes that Ayyappa is born of Vishnu's thigh as Mohini does not have a real womb. Another variant says that instead of a biological origin, Ayyappa sprang from Shiva's semen, which he ejaculated upon embracing Mohini. Ayyappa is referred to as Hariharaputra, "the son of Vishnu (Hari) and Shiva (Hara)", and grows up to be a great hero. Another tale says after Surpanaka's destruction, Shiva wishes to see Mohini and mesmerized by her looks, has union with her resulting in the birth of Ayyapppa.

The Tamil text Kanda Puranam narrates about the birth of Shasta identified with Aiyanar. The text tells just before the tale that Vishnu is Shiva's Shakti (wife and power) Parvati in a male form. The legend begins with Shiva's request and Vishnu's agreement to show his illusionary Mohini form, that he assumed for the distribution of amrita. Shiva falls in love with Mohini and proposes a union with her. Mohini-Vishnu declines saying that union of two men was unfruitful. Shiva informs Mohini-Vishnu that he was just one of forms of his Shakti ("female consort"). Thereafter, their union resulted in the birth of a dark boy with red locks, who was named Hariharaputra. Further, he was also known as Shasta and Aiyannar.

In the Agni Purana, as the enchanted Shiva follows Mohini, drops of his semen fall on the ground and become lingas, Shiva's symbols. His seed also generates the monkey-god Hanuman, who helps Vishnu's avatar Rama in his fight against Ravana in the Ramayana. The Shiva Purana says that by the mere glimpse of Mohini, Shiva spurts out his seed. The seed was collected and poured into the ear of Añjanā, who gave birth to Hanuman, the incarnation of Shiva. The latter is retold in the Thai and Malaysian version of the Ramayana. Though Hanuman springs from Shiva's seed, he is also considered as a combined son of Vishnu and Shiva.

The Buddhist version of the Bhasmasura tale continues with Shiva (Ishvara) asking the female-Vishnu, who is seated on a swing, to marry him. She asks Shiva to get the permission of his wife Umayangana to take her home. Shiva returns with Umayangana's consent to find the female-Vishnu pregnant, who sends him back to get permission to bring a pregnant woman home. When he returns, a child is born and female-Vishnu is pregnant again. She requests Shiva to seek approval to bring a pregnant woman with a child home. This happens six more times. Finally, Shiva brings Umayangana with him to witness the miraculous woman. Vishnu then returns to his male form. Umayangana embraces the six youngest children merging them into the six-headed Skanda, while the eldest, named Aiyanayaka ("eldest brother") remains intact. Aiyanayaka is identified with Aiyanar.

The rare instance where an "explicit, male homosexual act" is suggested is in a Telugu text where when Shiva is busy lovemaking with Mohini-Vishnu, the latter returns to his original form and still the lovemaking continues.

Mohini plays a lesser role in a Shaiva legend in the Skanda Purana. Here, Vishnu as Mohini joins Shiva to teach a lesson to arrogant sages. A group of sages are performing rituals in a forest, and start to consider themselves as gods. To humble them, Shiva takes the form of an attractive young beggar (Bhikshatana) and Vishnu becomes Mohini, his wife. While the sages fall for Mohini, their women wildly chase Shiva. When they regain their senses, they perform a black magic sacrifice, which produces a serpent, a lion, an elephant (or tiger) and a dwarf, all of which are overpowered by Shiva. Shiva then dances on the dwarf and takes the form of Nataraja, the cosmic dancer. The legend is retold in the Tamil Kovil Puranam and Kandha Puranam with some variation. This legend is also told in the Sthala Purana related to the Chidambaram Temple dedicated to Shiva-Nataraja.

Another legend from the Linga Purana says that the embracing of love-struck Shiva and Mohini led to be their merging into one body. At this moment, Mohini became Vishnu again, resulting the composite deity Harihara, whose right side of the body is Shiva and left side is Vishnu in his male form. In the temple in Sankarnayinarkovil near Kalugumalai is one of the rarest exceptions to iconography of Harihara (Sankara-Narayana). The deity is depicted similar to the Ardhanari, the composite form of Shiva-Parvati, where right side of the body is the male Shiva and left side is female. This image's female side represents Mohini and it, as a whole, symbolizes the union of Shiva and Mohini. In a Harihara image, the Shiva side has an erect phallus (urdhva linga) and relates to Shiva's love to his left side Vishnu-Mohini. The influence of Shakta traditions on Shaiva ones may have led to the development of composite images like Harihara, where Vishnu is identified with Shiva's consort, or Mohini. Like the Kanda Puranam narrative, the Shaiva saint Appar identifies Vishnu as Parvati (Uma), the female counterpart of Shiva.

Other legends 

In the Brahma Vaivarta Purana, Shiva creates an apsara (nymph) named Mohini, who fells in love with the creator-god Brahma. While trying to seduce Brahma, she says, "A man who refuses to make love to a woman tortured by desire is a eunuch. Whether a man is ascetic or amorous, he must not spurn a woman who approaches him, or he will go to Hell. Come now and make love to me." In one breath, Brahma replies, "Go away, Mother". Later, he argues that he is like her father, and thus, too old for Mohini. Brahma then compares her with a young daughter visiting her father. An angered Mohini then reminds him of his carnal nature by mocking that Brahma had earlier desired his own daughter and leaves him. After sleeping with the love god Kama to sate her arousal, Mohini regrets her actions and sobs. Meanwhile Vishnu explains to Brahma that the purpose of the event to break the latter's pride.
                                   
Another South Indian folktale tells of the Mahabharata hero Aravan (who becomes the Tamil god Kuttantavar), who was married to Mohini, before his self-sacrifice. Aravan agrees to become the sacrificial victim for the Kalappali ("sacrifice to the battlefield") to ensure the victory of the Pandavas, his father, and his uncles. Before being sacrificed to goddess Kali, Aravan asks three boons from Krishna, the guide of the Pandavas. The third boon was that Aravan should be married before the sacrifice so that he could get the right of cremation and funerary offerings (bachelors were buried). This third boon, however, is found only in the folk cults. To fulfill this wish in the Kuttantavar cult myth, Krishna turns into Mohini, marries Aravan, and spends the night with him. Then after the sacrifice, Mohini laments Aravan's death, breaking her bangles, beating her breasts, and discarding her bridal finery. She then returns to the original form of Krishna. The legend of the marriage of Aravan and Krishna in his female form as Mohini, and Mohini-Krishna's widowhood after Aravan's sacrifice, forms the central theme of an eighteen-day annual festival in the Tamil month of Cittirai (April–May) at Koovagam. The marriage ceremony is re-enacted by transgender Hijras, who play the role of Mohini-Krishna.

Cultural interpretations

According to mythologist Pattanaik, Mohini is just a disguise to delude the demon Bhasmasura, rather than a sexual transformation in this legend. Mohini is a disillusion, Vishnu's maya.

Stories in which Shiva knows of Mohini's true nature have been interpreted to "suggest the fluidity of gender in sexual attraction". Pattanaik writes while Westerners may interpret the Shiva-Mohini union as homosexual, traditional Hindus do not agree to this interpretation. He also writes that those focusing only on homoeroticism miss the narrative's deeper metaphysical significance: Mohini's femininity represents the material aspect of reality, and Mohini's seduction is another attempt to induce the ascetic Shiva into taking an interest in worldly matters. Only Vishnu has the power to "enchant" Shiva; a demon who tried to enchant and hurt Shiva in form of a woman was killed in the attempt.

Another interpretation posits that the Mohini tale suggests that Vishnu's maya blinds even supernatural beings. Mohini is "the impersonation of the magically delusive nature of existence which fetters all beings to the rounds of births and deaths and vicissitudes of life." Mohini also does not have an independent existence; she exists only as a temporary delusion, and is absorbed back into Vishnu after serving her purpose.

The legend of the union of Mohini-Vishnu and Shiva may also be written as part of the desire to have a common child of the two cosmic patriarchs of Hinduism.

Worship

On the fifth day of Brahmotsavam, Venkateshwara is dressed as Mohini and paraded in a grand procession.

In Goa, Mohini is worshipped as Mahalasa or Mahalasa Narayani. She is the Kuladevi (family goddess) of many Hindus from western and southern India, including Goud Saraswat Brahmins, Karhade Brahmins, Daivajnas and Bhandaris. The chief temple of Mahalasa Narayani is at Mardol, Goa, though her temples also exist in the states of Karnataka, Kerala, Maharashtra, and Gujarat. Mahalasa has four hands, carrying a Trishula, a sword, a severed head, and a drinking bowl. She stands on a prostrate man or demon, as a tiger or lion licks blood dripping from the severed head. Goud Saraswat Brahmins as well as Vaishnavas from Goa and South Canara identify her with Mohini and call her Narayani and Rahu-matthani, the slayer of Rahu, as told in the Bhavishya Purana.

Mahalasa is also called Mhalsa, the consort of Khandoba, a local incarnation of Shiva. As the consort of Khandoba, her chief temple - the Mohiniraj temple - is located at Nevasa, where she is worshiped as a four-armed goddess and identified with Mohini. Mhalsa is often depicted with two arms and accompanying Khandoba on his horse or standing besides him.

The central icon of the Jaganmohini-Kesava Swany temple at Ryali, discovered buried underground by the king in the 11th century, represents the male Vishnu in the front, while the back of the icon is the female Jagan-Mohini ("one who deludes the world") or Mohini, with a female hairdo and figure. A Sthala Purana tells that the flower in Mohini's hair fell at Ryali ("fall" in Telugu) when Mohini was being chased by Shiva.

Customs and ceremonies

Mohini has an important, dramatic role in several mythical works of South Indian drama like Yakshagana and Kathakali. In Kerala, however, where Mohini's son Ayyappa is popular, the Mohiniattam ("the dance of Mohini") is honored as an independent dance form. Named after the goddess, it is a dance meant exclusively for women and "an ideal example of the erotic form." The origins of Mohiniattam form are unknown, though it was popularized in the 1850s, but later banned as it was used by "loose women" to attract customers. The ban was lifted in 1950, after which it has seen a renewal.

The legends of Mohini are also being depicted in other dances, including the modern Kathak. The Sonal Nati, performed in the Saho area of Chamba district, Himachal Pradesh, retells the Mohini-Bhasmasura tale, and hence is known as the Mohini-Bhasmasura dance. It is performed on festive occasions, especially in the Saho fair held in Baisakh in the precincts of the Chandershekhar temple.

Notes

References

External links

Avatars of Vishnu
Hindu goddesses
Trickster goddesses
Buddhist mythology